Eunidia fulvida is a species of beetle in the family Cerambycidae. It was described by Francis Polkinghorne Pascoe in 1856, originally under the genus Anomoesia.

References

Beetles described in 1856
Eunidiini